USS Eastern Light (ID-3538) was a United States Navy cargo ship in commission from 1918 to 1919.

Construction, acquisition, and commissioning
Eastern Light was built as the commercial cargo ship SS Eastern Light and completed in September 1918 by the Osaka Iron Works Company at Innoshima, Japan, for the United States Shipping Board.  After she was converted for naval use at the Puget Sound Navy Yard at Bremerton, Washington, the Shipping Board transferred her to the U.S. Navy on 6 November 1918. The Navy assigned her the naval registry identification number 3538 and commissioned her on 6 December 1918 as USS Eastern Light (ID-3538).

Operational history
After loading a cargo of flour and other stores at Tacoma, Washington, Eastern Light departed Seattle, Washington, on 29 December 1918, bound for Norfolk, Virginia, where she arrived on 9 February 1919. She loaded cargo for the United States Food Administration there, then departed Norfolk on 13 February 1919 bound for Rotterdam in the Netherlands, where she arrived on 5 March 1919. Her cargo was transferred to barges there for use by the Commission for Relief in Belgium in relieving hunger in Belgium and northern France in the aftermath of World War I.

Ballasted with sand, Eastern Light got underway from Rotterdam and moved to Plymouth, England, then departed Plymouth for New York City, which she reached on 10 April 1919 after a 16-day transatlantic crossing.

Decommissioning and disposal
Eastern Light was decommissioned on 16 April 1919. The Navy transferred her back to the U.S. Shipping Board the same day.

Notes

References

NavSource Online: Section Patrol Craft Photo Archive: Eastern Light (ID 3538)

Auxiliary ships of the United States Navy
World War I cargo ships of the United States
1918 ships
Ships built by Osaka Iron Works